Mitha Khan Kakar is a Pakistani politician who is the current Provincial Minister of the Balochistan for Livestock and Dairy Development, in office since 30 August 2018. He has been a member of Provincial Assembly of the Balochistan since August 2018.

Political career
He was elected to the Provincial Assembly of the Balochistan as an independent candidate from Constituency PB-2 (Zhob) in 2018 Pakistani general election. He is now Parliamentary Secretary Mines & Minerals Development

On 27 August 2018, he was inducted into the provincial Balochistan cabinet of Chief Minister of Jam Kamal Khan with the status of a provincial minister. On 30 August 2018, he was appointed as advisor to Chief Minister on livestock and dairy development.

References

Living people
Politicians from Balochistan, Pakistan
Independent politicians in Pakistan
Year of birth missing (living people)